James A. Kenney III (born March 26, 1937 in Salisbury, Maryland) is a former judge of the Maryland Court of Special Appeals.  He joined the court on June 17, 1997 and retired March 26, 2007.

Kenney graduated from Dickinson College in 1959 and The George Washington University Law School in 1963.  He was an Assistant State's Attorney in St. Mary's County, Maryland from 1964–67, and is an adjunct associate professor of political science at St. Mary's College of Maryland.

External links
 Official biography

References

Living people
1937 births
Dickinson College alumni
George Washington University Law School alumni
Maryland Court of Special Appeals judges
St. Mary's College of Maryland faculty